The 2021–22 EFL Championship (referred to as the Sky Bet Championship for sponsorship reasons) was the 18th season of the Football League Championship under its current title and the 30th season under its current league division format.

Team changes 
The following teams have changed division since the 2020–21 season:

To Championship 
Promoted from League One
Hull City
Peterborough United
Blackpool

Relegated from the Premier League
Fulham
West Bromwich Albion
Sheffield United

From Championship 
Promoted to the Premier League
 Norwich City
 Watford
 Brentford

Relegated to League One
 Wycombe Wanderers 
 Rotherham United 
 Sheffield Wednesday

Stadiums

Personnel and sponsoring 

  Blackburn Rovers' shirt sponsor was Recoverite Compression until 18 January 2022 when the deal was ended prematurely.
  Luton Town's home shirt sponsor was JB Developments until 18 February 2022 when the deal was ended prematurely.

Managerial changes

League table

Play-offs 

First leg
 

Second leg

Huddersfield Town won 2–1 on aggregate. 

3–3 on aggregate. Nottingham Forest won 3–2 on penalties.

Final

Results

Season statistics

Scoring

Top scorers

{| class="wikitable" style="text-align:center"
! Rank
! Player
! Club
! Goals
|-
|rowspan="1"|1
|align="left"|  Aleksandar Mitrović
|align="left"| Fulham
|rowspan="1"|43
|-
|rowspan="1"|2
|align="left"|  Dominic Solanke
|align="left"| Bournemouth
|rowspan="1"|29
|-
|rowspan="3"|3
|align="left"|  Ben Brereton Díaz
|align="left"| Blackburn Rovers
|rowspan="3"|22
|-
|align="left"|  Joël Piroe
|align="left"| Swansea City
|-
|align="left"|  Andreas Weimann
|align="left"| Bristol City
|-
|rowspan="2"|6
|align="left"|  Karlan Grant
|align="left"| West Bromwich Albion
|rowspan="2"|18
|-
|align="left"|  Brennan Johnson1
|align="left"| Nottingham Forest
|-
|rowspan="1"|8
|align="left"|  Viktor Gyökeres
|align="left"| Coventry City
|rowspan="1"|17
|-
|rowspan="2"|9
|align="left"|  Elijah Adebayo
|align="left"| Luton Town
|rowspan="2"|16
|-
|align="left"|  Emil Riis Jakobsen
|align="left"| Preston North End
|}

 1 Includes 2 goals in The Championship play-offs.

Hat-tricks

Most assists

 1 Includes 1 assist in The Championship play-offs.

Clean sheets 

 1 Includes 1 clean sheet in The Championship play-offs.

Discipline

Player
 Most yellow cards: 16
 Matt Crooks 
 Most red cards: 2
 Fankaty Dabo 
 Darnell Furlong 
 Gary Gardner 
 Tom Lawrence 
 Jefferson Lerma 
 Jake Livermore 
 Ryan Manning

Club
 Most yellow cards: 107
Blackburn Rovers
 Most red cards: 7
Derby County
West Bromwich Albion

Awards

Monthly

Annual 

Championship Team of the Season

PFA Championship Team of the Year

Notes

References 

EFL Championship seasons
Eng
1
2
2021–22 EFL Championship